Kunjiramayanam ( The story of Kunjiraman) is a 2015 Indian Malayalam-language comedy film directed by debutant Basil Joseph and scripted by Deepu Pradeep.The film features Vineeth Sreenivasan, Dhyan Sreenivasan and Aju Varghese  in the lead roles. Kunjiramayanam was released on 28 August 2015.

Plot
Kunjiraman, the nephew of "Well-done" Vasu, plans to marry Vasu's daughter Thankamani. All plans are thwarted by Kunjiraman's dim-witted cousin brother Laalu, who places an inappropriate cassette in Kunjiraman's VCR, and later blaming it on Kunjiraman. With this incident, both families swear to have their child married before the other.

To avenge this, Kunjiraman goes to the Gulf to make money, meanwhile Laalu becomes an apprentice in Kuttan's tailoring shop, where he looks up to Kuttan as his role model. On Kunjiraman's return, he plans to marry well and before Thankamani's wedding. His mother Sumathi fixes a marriage for him with Sajitha. On their engagement day, Sajitha makes Kunjiraman promise to stop all his drinking activities, and breaks a "Salsa" bottle and returns to the Gulf. After several failed attempts to bring Salsa into the village, it is realized that Desam is now cursed and nobody is successful in bringing a bottle of Salsa.

Upon Kunjiraman's return, he becomes aware of the curse and publicly accepts the challenge to bring Salsa into Desam in front of Laalu and Vasu, as a way to obtain respect in front of his village. On the night before his wedding, he sets out to bring a bottle of Salsa, but ends up drunk and wakes up only the next noon, thereby cancelling the wedding.

After this Kunjiraman leaves to Gulf and after a series of events, Vasu reaches the village and unknowingly takes the bottle of Salsa that Ratheesh had bought earlier, only to find the villagers rushing to him and thus Vasu obtaining the status of a local hero. But with this departure, another curse had befallen the land, the curse of failed marriages.

Meanwhile, Laalu is convinced by Kuttan that the local policeman's sister, Reshma, has an eye for him. This makes Laalu very dreamy. But his dreams are shattered when Kunjiraman returns after a year and his mother fixes a marriage for him with Reshma. On hearing this Laalu secretly plots against Kunjiraman with Kuttan. They plan to lock the door of Reshma's room the night before the engagement in hopes of locking her in during the auspicious time, thereby calling off the engagement. But the drunk Kuttan ends up locking the door from inside and spending the night in her room. Fearing shame from the society and the greed of the people to have a wedding, Reshma weds Kuttan, leaving both Kunjiraman and Laalu broken-hearted. Kunjiraman departs back to the Gulf, but Kuttan tries to deviate Laalu from Reshma by convincing him that Paramu's daughter, Mallika, has an interest in him.

Meanwhile, Thankamani's wedding has been fixed and Kunjiraman's mother insists on him marrying Mallika on the same day and same temple, when he returns. Laalu upon hearing this tries to spoil the occasion the night before, once again with Kuttan, by doing the same "locking the door" plan. Upon which they discover Thankamani absconding (from her house to avoid the wedding) and they also learn that Kunjiraman never left and this was planned with Thankamani. All unite and they plan a way to prevent Thankamani's fiancée from reaching the temple.

On the wedding day, the group tries to block the way to prevent the groom from reaching the temple, only to discover him as a person not to be messed with, Manoharan. Manoharan agrees to this compromise and agrees to attend the wedding just for the sake of it.

At the temple, Kunjiraman and Thankamani are married, without prior consent, but the occasion goes well. But Manoharan plays his own cards and does not let Laalu marry Mallika, instead he marries Mallika, claiming that he will not leave Desam empty-handed, leaving Laalu broken-hearted once again. It is later seen that Mallika has had several affairs and Manoharan is convinced that Desam is cursed and feels that he has received the biggest curse of Desam.

Cast

Production 
The movie is the debut of director Basil Joseph who was earlier known for directing short films Oru Thundupadam and Priyamvadha Katharayano with his friend Robin Charls . Brothers  Vineeth Sreenivasan and Dhyan Sreenivasan are acting together for the first time.

The original schedule for the shoot was 44 days in Kudallur village, near Kollengode in Palakkad. The film shooting started on 23 April 2015 and got completed in 35 days with two schedules.

Reception

Critical reception
The movie was released on 28 August 2015 across Kerala in 60 theatres.

Malayala Manorama gave a rating of 3/5 and said "Kunjiramayanam is an entertaining film for sure, definitely one that belongs to the not-to-be-missed category". Rejath RG of Kerala Kaumudi said, "Every character in Kunjiramayanam leaves an impression on the viewer. And that's the best thing about the movie. There are lots of scenes that offer genuine laughs. By the time the movie is over we feel like we have visited the Desham village. That signifies the success of the debutante director Basil Joseph." Entertainment website Filmibeat.com rated 2.5/5 and said "Kuniramayanam is a logic less fun-filled entertainer, for a one-time watch". Paresh C Palicha of Rediff.com gave a rating of 2.5/5 and said "The movie has things that keep us interested in proceedings though it tends to get repetitive once in a while. But we can confidently say that Kunjiramayanam is enjoyable".

Box office
The film made at a budget of ₹3cr collected a sum of ₹6cr within 14 days of release. Asianet bought the satellite rights. It collected ₹10cr from Kerala after 35 days of release. Kunjiramayanam Reached 2nd Among the Onam Releases.

Music

The soundtrack was released by Muzik247 on 4 August 2015 with songs composed by Justin Prabhakaran and lyrics written by Manu Manjith.

References

External links
 

2010s Malayalam-language films
2015 films
Films shot in Kerala
Films shot in Palakkad
Films directed by Basil Joseph